Chin State Hluttaw is the legislature of the Burmese state of Chin State. It is a unicameral body, consisting of 24 members, including 18 elected members and 6 military representatives.  As of February 2016, the Hluttaw was led by speaker Zo Bawi of the National League for Democracy (NLD).

As of the 2015 general election, the National League for Democracy (NLD) won the most contested seats in the legislature. Nevertheless, the NLD was unable to win an absolute majority in the legislature due to the 6 appointed military members in the legislature.

Election results

2015

See also
State and Region Hluttaws
Pyidaungsu Hluttaw

References

Unicameral legislatures
Chin State
Legislatures of Burmese states and regions